Violently Delicate is the debut full-length studio album by Israeli alternative rock band Eatliz, released on November 1, 2007.

The album was released in a special album release show in Israel on November 8, 2007. The release show took place at the Barby club, Tel Aviv, and saw the band hosting Israeli progressive rock musician Shlomo Gronich for a special song.

Track listing

Personnel
Lee Triffon - lead vocals
Guy Ben Shetrit - guitar, vocals
Amit Erez - guitar, vocals
Or Bahir - guitar
Adam Shefflan - bass, vocals
Omry Hanegby - drums, percussion

References

2007 debut albums
Eatliz albums